Bahawalpur National Awami Party is a Pakistani political party formed in 2010 by Nawab Salahuddin Abbasi.

Nawab Salahuddin Abbasi was a Member of Parliament in Pakistan. He is also the nephew of Nawab Sadeq Mohammad Khan V, of Abbasi Dynasty, who was the last ruling Nawab of the princely state of Bahawalpur. He has been elected five times as Member of National Assembly from the city Ahmadpur East. He is also the Chief of Bahawalpur National Awami Party (BNAP) which is allied with Imran Khan's Pakistan Tehreek-i-Insaf. Nawab Salahuddin Abbasi is also a strong campaigner of restoration of Bahawalpur province and an influential personality of South Punjab.

References

Political parties established in 2010
2013 establishments in Pakistan
Bahawalpur Division